The Department of Communications and the Arts was an Australian government department that existed between January 1994 and October 1998.

Scope
Information about the department's functions and/or government funding allocation could be found in the Administrative Arrangements Orders, the annual Portfolio Budget Statements and in the Department's annual reports.

At its creation, the Department was responsible for:
Postal and telecommunications services; 
Management of the electromagnetic spectrum; 
Broadcasting services; 
Management of government records; and 
Cultural affairs, including support for the arts.

Structure
The Department was an Australian Public Service department, staffed by officials who were responsible to the Minister for Communications and the Arts, Michael Lee and then Richard Alston.

References

Ministries established in 1994
Communications and the Arts
1994 establishments in Australia
1998 disestablishments in Australia